Emmanuel I. Rashba (born October 30, 1927, Kyiv) is a Soviet-American theoretical physicist of Jewish origin who worked in Ukraine, Russia and in the United States. Rashba is known for his contributions to different areas of condensed matter physics and spintronics, especially the Rashba effect in spin physics, and also for the prediction of electric dipole spin resonance (EDSR), that was widely investigated and became a regular tool for operating electron spins in nanostructures, phase transitions in spin-orbit coupled systems driven by change of the Fermi surface topology, Giant oscillator strength of impurity excitons, and coexistence of free and self-trapped excitons. The principal subject of spintronics is all-electric operation of electron spins, and EDSR was the first phenomenon predicted and experimentally observed in this field.

Early life
Born in Kyiv, Ukraine, Rashba survived the Nazi invasion during the Second World War by fleeing with his family to Kazan where he started studying physics at the Kazan University. His father Iosif (Joseph) Rashba was a prominent defence lawyer, a widely educated humanitarian, and his mother Rosalia was a teacher of English. After returning to Kyiv he graduated, with high honors, from the Physics Department of Kyiv University in 1949. His Instructors were Alexander Davydov, Solomon Pekar and Kirill Tolpygo.

Career
Rashba' graduation from the university fell onto the last years of Stalin's reign darkened by extreme national chauvinism. As a result, he had to change temporary jobs five times during the five following years. During this time he initiated, as applied to dams, theory of gravitational stresses in growing elastic bodies  (non-Euclidean grows, in current terminology), and also developed theory of exciton-phonon coupling in molecular crystals. In 1954 Rashba was accepted to the Semiconductor Department of the Institute of Physics of the Academy of Sciences of the Ukraine where he initially worked on the theory of transistors but earned his PhD degree in 1956 on his work on exciton-phonon coupling (including prediction of coexistence of free and self-trapped excitons, discovered experimentally two decades later on, based on the concept of self-trapping barrier for excitons essential for current work on Sun energy conversion). When the Institute for Semiconductors of the same Academy was established in 1960, Rashba headed there the Department for Theory of Semiconductor Devices. He earned his Doctor of Sciences degree from the A.F. Ioffe Institute in Leningrad in 1963 for his work on spin-orbit coupling in semiconductors and exciton spectroscopy of molecular crystals (deducing energy spectra of excitons in pure crystals from optical spectra of mixed crystals, in collaboration with Vladimir Broude). In collaboration with Solomon Pekar, Rashba introduced a mechanism of spin-orbit interaction in magnetic media originating from the coupling of electron spin to microscopically inhomogeneous magnetic field of magnetic background.

In 1966, after the Institute of Theoretical Physics of the Academy of Sciences of USSR (currently the Landau Institute for Theoretical Physics) was established in Chernogolovka (Moscow district), Rashba moved there and served as the head of the Theory of Semiconductors Division and afterwards as a principal scientist until 1997. During 1967-1991, Rashba also served as a professor of physics at the Moscow Institute of Physics and Technology (MIPT).

In 1991 Rashba moved to the United States, where he worked as a research scholar at the University of Utah (1992–1999), SUNY at Buffalo (2001–2004), and Harvard University (2004–2015). He was also associated with Massachusetts Institute of Technology (MIT, 2000–2004), served as an adjunct professor at Dartmouth College (2000–2003) and as a Rutherford Professor at the Loughborough University (2007–2010). During this period Rashba worked mostly on spintronics and physics of nanosystems. After Rashba's severe neurological disease (1997) his work was facilitated by his wife Erna and the family of his daughter.

For about 15 years Rashba served as a member of the editorial boards of the journals JETP Letters and Journal of Luminescence.

Recognitions

Rashba is a Fellow of the American Physical Society. Among his recognitions are 1966 National Prize of the USSR and the International Conference on Luminescence ICL'99 Prize for his work on optical spectroscopy, Ioffe (1987, USSR), Pekar (2007, Ukraine), Doctor of Honoris Causa of Bogolyubov Institute for Theoretical Physics (2022, Ukraine), and Oliver Buckley (2022, US) Prizes for his work on spin-related phenomena, and 2005 Sir Nevill Mott (UK) and 2005 Arkady Aronov (Israel) Lectureships. 

Rashba's name became a part of a number of technical terms such as Rashba Hamiltonian, giant Rashba systems, Rashba physics, etc., which are parts of the titles of about 4000 scientific papers. According to Google Scholar, paper Ref. is the most cited and Ref. is the second most cited of the papers published in these journals, respectively.

See also

Nanotechnology
Dresselhaus effect

References

External links 
 Pioneer in spintronics celebrates birthday, Harvard Gazette, 6 March 2008
 Institute of Physics of the National Academy of Sciences of Ukraine
 Page of the V. Ye. Lashkaryov Institute of Semiconductor Physics of NAS of Ukraine
 http://isp.kiev.ua/index.php/uk/history-menu-ukr/912-2013-05-29-12-42-40/history/5001-2014-09-05-11-48-46 (in Russian: V. E. Lashkaryov Institute for Physics of Semiconductors, National Academy of Sciences of Ukraine)
 Landau Institute for Theoretical Physics
 http://www.fz-juelich.de/SharedDocs/Termine/PGI/PGI-1/EN/2010/d_term_2010-01-06.html;jsessionid=F8A3F7919770C907930BD4CC3BC4B105?nn=1328342, Wilhelm and Else Heraeus Seminar:"Rashba and related spin-orbit effects in metals" (Germany, January 2010)
 https://web.archive.org/web/20070717135437/http://www.lboro.ac.uk/departments/ph/staff/eir.html, Department of Physics, Loughborough University
 https://www.physics.harvard.edu/node/549http
 http://physicsworld.com/cws/article/news/2011/aug/17/rashba-gets-hotter-and-more-pronounced
 https://physicsworld.com/a/breathing-new-life-into-the-rashba-effect/
 News and views from the Journal of Physics series, http://jphysplus.iop.org/2015/06/05/restoring-the-scientific-record/
 Jews in Physics, Jinfo.org, http://www.jinfo.org/

Further reading 
  A. Manchon, H. C. Koo, J. Nitta, S. M. Frolov, and R. A. Duine, New perspectives for Rashba spin–orbit coupling, Nature Materials 14, 871-882 (2015).
 G. Bihlmayer, O. Rader and R. Winkler, Focus on the Rashba effect, New J. Phys. 17, 050202 (2015), http://iopscience.iop.org/1367-2630/17/5/050202/pdf/1367-2630/17/5/050202.pdf
 
 E. I. Rashba, Semiconductors with a loop of extrema, Czech. J. Phys., Special Publication (Prague, 1961), pp. 45–-48 (Proceedings of the International Conference on Semiconductor Physics, Prague 1960), English translation: Journ. of Electr. Spectrosc. and Related Phenom. 201,   Special Issue: SI,  Pages: 4-5,   Published: May 2015.https://dash.harvard.edu/bitstream/handle/1/23927493/Prague_1960.pdf?sequence=1
 E. I. Rashba, Preface, Journ. of Electr. Spectrosc. and Related Phenom. 201,   Special Issue: SI, Pages: 1-1,   Published: May 2015, https://dash.harvard.edu/bitstream/handle/1/30758220/JES_Preface.pdf?sequence=1  
 
 E. I. Rashba and V. I. Sheka, Symmetry of Energy Bands in Crystals of Wurtzite Type II. Symmetry of Bands with Spin-Orbit Interaction Included, Fiz. Tverd. Tela: Collected Papers, v. 2, 162, 1959. English translation: http://iopscience.iop.org/1367-2630/17/5/050202/media/njp050202_suppdata.pdf
 V. L. Broude, E. I. Rashba, and E. F. Sheka, Spectroscopy of molecular excitons (Springer, NY) 1985.
 A.S. Ioselevich and E. I. Rashba, Theory of Nonradiative Trapping in Solids, in: Quantum Tunneling in Condensed Media (Elsevier, 1992), pp. 347–425 https://books.google.com/books?hl=en&lr=&id=ElDtL9qZuHUC&oi=fnd&pg=PA347&dq=%22E+I+Rashba%22&ots=KjE3JYn9kl&sig=0Aj4IdVj0zqPSyq3ep_RT6sOlgQ#v=onepage&q=%22E%20I%20Rashba%22&f=false
 JETP Letters Golden Archive, http://www.jetpletters.ac.ru/cgi-bin/front/gf-view/en/the-paper-properties-of-a-2d-electron-gas-with-lifted-spectral-degeneracy-1984.
 Journal of Physics 50th anniversary: viewpoints collection,
 https://dash.harvard.edu/bitstream/handle/1/28237451/J_Phys_C_50_published_versiont.pdf?sequence=1
 A. V. Manzhirov and S. A. Lychev, The mathematical theory of growing solids: Finite deformations, Doklady Physics, 57, 160-163 (2012). (MAIK Nauka/Interperiodica).
 L. Truskinovsky and G. Zurlo, Nonlinear elasticity of incompatible surface growth, Phys. Rev. E 99, 053001 (2019).

1927 births
Living people
Soviet Jews
Jewish scientists
Lenin Prize winners
Theoretical physicists
Soviet physicists
Scientists from Kyiv
Taras Shevchenko National University of Kyiv alumni
University of Utah faculty
University at Buffalo faculty
Dartmouth College faculty
Harvard University faculty
Fellows of the American Physical Society
Oliver E. Buckley Condensed Matter Prize winners
Academic staff of the Moscow Institute of Physics and Technology
Soviet emigrants to the United States